Gaspar Trizenieski was a Roman Catholic prelate who served as  Auxiliary Bishop of Gniezno (1660–?).

Biography
On 30 Aug 1660, Gaspar Trizenieski was appointed during the papacy of Pope Alexander VII as Auxiliary Bishop of Gniezno and Titular Bishop of Halmiros. In 1645, he was consecrated bishop by Zygmunt Czyżowski, Titular Bishop of Lacedaemonia, with Stefan Kazimierz Charbicki, Auxiliary Bishop of Lviv and Titular Bishop of Nicopolis ad Iaterum, and Stanisław Domaniewski, Titular Bishop of Margarita, serving as co-consecrators.

References 

17th-century Roman Catholic bishops in the Polish–Lithuanian Commonwealth
Bishops appointed by Pope Alexander VII